Zack Nimrod Tabudlo (born December 6, 2001) is a Filipino singer, songwriter and musician. He was first seen as a contestant on the first season of The Voice Kids under Bamboo Mañalac's mentorship, where he was eliminated in the competition's second round. He later began his musical career in 2018 before he rose to fame in 2020 when he joined MCA Music (now UMG Philippines) through sub-label Island Records Philippines.

His debut single "Nangangamba" was released in 2020. His song "Binibini", released in 2021, broke a record as the top local song on Spotify's Philippines charts. His debut album, Episode, was released on October 15, 2021. His track "Pano" became the longest-running number-one OPM song on Spotify Philippines, the first number-one song to debut on the Billboard Philippines Songs chart, and charted in other Southeast Asian countries, including Malaysia, Thailand, and Vietnam.

In 2022, Tabudlo became one of the artists in the newly-launched Republic Records Philippines label under UMG Philippines.

Discography

Studio albums

Singles

As a lead artist

As a featured artist

Other charted songs

Notes

References

2000 births
Musicians from Metro Manila
Living people
Singers from Metro Manila
MCA Music Inc. (Philippines) artists
The Voice Kids (Philippine TV series) contestants
21st-century Filipino singers